The Ministry of Science and Technology (MCT) of Brazil is the civilian cabinet organization which coordinates science, technology, and innovation activities in the country. It is headed by the Minister of Science, Technology and Innovation.

Agencies under the MCT
 Brazilian Innovation Agency (FINEP)
 National Council for Scientific and Technological Development  (CNPq)
 National Nuclear Energy Commission (CNEN)
 Brazilian Center for Physics Research (CBPF)
 National Institute for Space Research (INPE)
 Brazilian Space Agency (AEB)
 Brazilian National Laboratory of Scientific Computation (LNCC)
 Brazilian National Institute of Pure and Applied Mathematics (IMPA)
 Brazilian National Laboratory of Synchrotron Light
 Renato Archer Research Center  (CTI)

Ministers since 1985

See also
 Ministry of Science, Technology, Innovation and Communications (Brazil)
 Brazilian science and technology
 Brazilian Academy of Sciences
 List of federal institutions of Brazil
 Brazilian–Argentine Agency for Accounting and Control of Nuclear Materials

References

External links 

  

Brazil
Science and Technology
Science and Technology
Brazil, Science and Technology
1985 establishments in Brazil